Prakash Raj (born 11 June 1998) is a Singaporean footballer who last played as a defender for Tanjong Pagar United.Prakash signed for the Young Lions FC in 2018.

References

Singaporean footballers
Living people
1998 births
Singaporean people of Tamil descent
Singaporean sportspeople of Indian descent
Association football defenders
Young Lions FC players